Quararibea pterocalyx, the wild palm or cinco dedos, is a species of flowering plant in the family Malvaceae. It is found in Colombia, Costa Rica, Panama, and Venezuela. It is threatened by habitat loss.

References

pterocalyx
Flora of Costa Rica
Flora of Colombia
Flora of Panama
Flora of Venezuela
Vulnerable flora of South America
Taxonomy articles created by Polbot